Douglas is an electoral ward in Wigan, England. It forms part of Wigan Metropolitan Borough Council, as well as the parliamentary constituency of Wigan.

Councillors 
The ward is represented by three councillors: Shirley Dewhurst (Lab), Pat Draper (Lab), and Sheila Ramsdale.

 indicates seat up for re-election.
 indicates seat won in by-election.

References

Wigan Metropolitan Borough Council Wards